David C. Ward is an American historian, published poet and author, and civil servant. He served at the National Portrait Gallery as senior historian.

Early life

Ward studied under Christopher Lasch and Eugene Genovese at University of Rochester graduating in 1974  and subsequently attended graduate school at Warwick University (MA in labour history, 1975) and Yale University, MA (1975), MPhil, 1977).

Senior historian at National Portrait Gallery
Ward began working at the National Portrait Gallery, Smithsonian Institution in 1979. Ward's early work was focused on American art, culture and portraiture. He worked on the documentary history project publishing five volumes on the selected papers of artist Charles Willson Peale and his family. In 2012, Ward was appointed associate director and senior historian.

Hide Seek, Curator
Ward curated numerous shows at the National Portrait Gallery, including "Hide/Seek: Difference and Desire in American Portraiture", "Face Value:Abstraction in Portraiture", and The Face of Battle. Hide Seek, which opened in 2010, was the first exhibit hosted by a museum of national stature to address the topic and as such invited immediate political attack from conservatives who falsely argued that Hide/Seek was gay propaganda. It was also the largest and most expensive exhibit in the NPG's history, and more private donors contributed to it than to any prior NPG exhibit. In 2010, Ward interviewed Patti Smith for her book Just Kids. This was related to Hide Seek. In addition to this, Ward did shows on Whitman, Grant & Lee, Lincoln, and Alexander Gardner.

Author
Ward has published two full books of poetry, Call Waiting (2014) and Internal Difference (2011). Both of these have been published with Carcanet Press. Ward "has published more than 100 poems in Anglo-American literary magazines".  Ward in 2004 wrote, for the Smithsonian, an analytical biography of Charles Wilson Peale, Charles Willson Peale: Art and Selfhood in the Early Republic (University of California Press, 2004).

Exhibitions
The Face of Battle (2017)
The Sweat of Their Face (2015)
Dark Fields of the Republic: Alexander Gardner's Photographs (2015)
One Life: Grant & Lee (2014)
Face Value: Portraiture in the Age of Abstraction (2014)
Poetic Likeness: Modern American Poets (2012)
Portraiture Now: Asian Americans Portraits of Encounter (2011)
Hide/Seek: Difference and Desire in American Portraiture (2010)
The Mask of Lincoln (2008)
Walt Whitman (2006)

Works
 Ward, David C. 2004 Charles Willson Peale: Art and Selfhood in the Early Republic Berkley, California : University of California Press
 Ward, David C. 2010 Hide/Seek: Difference and Desire in American Portraiture Washington D.C.: Smithsonian Books
 Ward, David C. 2011 Internal Difference Manchester, United Kingdom: Carcanet Press
 Ward, David C. 2014 Call Waiting Manchester, United Kingdom: Carcanet Press
 Ward, David C. 2014 Face Value: Portraiture in the Age of Abstraction Washington D.C.: Smithsonian Books

Further reading
 Ward, John William. 1955. Andrew Jackson, Symbol for an Age. New York: Oxford University Press.
 Ward, John William. 1969 Red, White, and Blue: Men, Books, and Ideas in American Culture . New York: Oxford University Press

Notes

Living people
American historians
American writers
Peale family
University of Rochester alumni
Alumni of the University of Warwick
Yale University alumni
1952 births